KSDP is a Public Radio and Full Service formatted broadcast radio station licensed to Sand Point, Alaska, serving Aleutians East.  KSDP is owned and operated by Aleutian Peninsula Broadcasting, Inc.

References

External links
KSDP Radio Online

SDP